Mohamed Elias Mesli is an Algerian politician who was the minister for agriculture in the 1992 government of Belaid Abdessalam.

References 

Year of birth missing (living people)
Algerian politicians
Possibly living people